A Song to Remember (simplified Chinese: 星洲之夜) is a MediaCorp Channel 8 historical-cum-musical drama which is set in the 1930s to 1940s in early Singapore before World War II. It debuted on Channel 8 on 22 November 2011 and was telecast every weekday night at 9.00 pm. It stars  Qi Yuwu , Joanne Peh , Eelyn Kok , Julie Tan , Desmond Tan , Chen Hanwei & Pan Lingling as the casts of the series. It is a year end blockbuster for 2011. The Series is repeated at 5.30pm on Channel 8 on weekdays and 4.30pm on weekends.

This drama stars Qi Yuwu and Joanne Peh who had paired up thrice after The Little Nyonya and C.L.I.F., and Eelyn Kok, Julie Tan and Desmond Tan. Chen Hanwei plays a villain in this drama while Eelyn Kok is also another antagonist. Viewers can catch episodes on xinmsn catchup from 23 November 2011.

It was reported that the scriptwriter Ang Ee Tee took several years to complete the script of this drama. Despite large amounts of resources and money pumped in for the production and promotion of this serial, the drama was not well received by the audience when it was broadcast. Many perceived the show to be boring and slow-paced, and the acting skills of some of the main cast members were heavily criticised. This drama ranked 9th (out of 11 dramas at the 9pm slot) in the Year 2011 viewership ratings, coming in one of the last. On the other hand, smaller scale productions such as Love Thy Neighbour managed to clinch the top spot.

The drama was encored from 18 July 2012 to 29 August 2012, at 5:30pm, pre-empted on 9 August due to the live telecast of the National Day Parade.

Cast

Awards and nominations
This series garnered eight nominations in the performance category for Star Awards 2012, five in Show 1 and three in Show 2. Results were announced on 22 and 29 April 2012 during which the award ceremony was televised live on MediaCorp TV Channel 8. The other dramas nominated for Best Drama Series were Secrets for Sale, Kampong Ties, C.L.I.F., and On the Fringe, and Best Theme Songs were Secrets for Sale, Kampong Ties, The Oath, and Devotion.

Star Awards 2012

A Song to Remember was one of three dramas parodied in a skit during the awards ceremony with ceremony co-host Lee Teng as "director". Guo Liang played villain Xu Kun, Quan Yi Fong played Yu Hong and Dennis Chew played Mo Liguang. The criticism of the series being to melodramatic was referenced throughout as Guo repeatedly complains about how Quan's character Yu Hong speaks her lines "too slowly" and Lee comments that Mo is "too expressionless".

Trivia
In 2011, Dai Xiangyu chose to return to China to film a co-production drama Precious. He played Ling Zhi Chu in Precious. As a result, the 35 years old Qi Yuwu replaced him to play the role of Mo Li Guang, as the male lead despite being too old for the early 20s role .
The Singapore theatre's name is "Paramoun" compared to "Paramount".
This drama was supposed to be an anniversary drama. It was however also added as an end-year blockbuster as the episodes were broadcast.
This drama would be the first drama to have an all-new credits reel layout.
Married couple Alan Tern and Priscelia Chan play husband and wife for the second time.
Chen Hanwei's first villainous role.

Overseas broadcast

References

2011 Singaporean television series debuts
Singapore Chinese dramas
Channel 8 (Singapore) original programming